Studio is the fifth studio album by the Swedish rock band Tages, released on 4 December 1967 on Parlophone in Sweden. Following the success of their album Contrast, Tages began working on their follow-up to it. Hampered by a long summer tour, the album was largely recorded between October and November 1967, although sessions span all the way back to April. It was primarily recorded at Europafilm Studios in Bromma, Stockholm with Anders Henriksson producing. The band took a break in recording the album in October for a tour of England organized by Parlophone, which allowed them access to EMI Studios in London, where two of the album's tracks were recorded. One single was released from the album, "She's Having a Baby Now", although the sessions also produced the non-album single "Treat Her Like a Lady".

Studio was largely conceived and written by bassist Göran Lagerberg and producer Henriksson, but features songwriting credits from all band members, particularly lead vocalist Tommy Blom and rhythm guitarist Danne Larsson. It was largely written at Henriksson's home in Tureberg and at his parent's summer cottage in Tällberg, Dalarna. Musically, it further experiments with the psychedelia found on their previous two albums Extra Extra and Contrast, but expands on it by incorporating elements of their Scandinavian roots through Nordic- and Swedish folk music into the songs, creating an unprecedented fusion between their cultural identity and rock music. Lyrically, several songs on the album feature controversial lyrical content. The album features experimental studio techniques, including backmasking on guitars and drums.

Studio was Tages first album to be released with a gatefold cover, which depicted Tages' members during the recording process of the album. Upon original release for the Christmas rush, the album became an unexpected commercial failure as fans generally disliked the new direction the band took with the album, which resulted in a short film featuring the band, Dalamania, airing on Sveriges Television. It did receive positive reviews in the press, with many publications noting the fusion of folk music and the production efforts of Henriksson. Largely ignored shortly after release, Studio started receiving a cult following during the 1980s and has since seen retrospective critical acclaim. In 1997, it was ranked the 36th best Swedish album of all time by the Swedish Musicians' Union. It was the group's last album with Blom and their last under the name Tages

Background

Previous folk influences 
Tages roots in folk music can be traced back to their origins in 1963, when they formed as a skiffle group. The group's three first singles, "Sleep Little Girl" (1964), "I Should Be Glad" and "Don't Turn Your Back" (both 1965) all shared a sound of soft rock along with melodic folk rock owed to their usage of acoustic guitars and general influence from folk rock group the Searchers. All three of these singles were successful on the two Swedish charts, Tio i Topp and Kvällstoppen, with all of them reaching the top-three. After seeing Howlin' Wolf and Lightnin' Hopkins appear live in Gothenburg, the group had begun abandoning their folk roots in favour of a sound much more oriented in rhythm and blues and hard rock, evident on their fourth single "The One For You". Henriksson was also key in this musical change as his production also switched the band's general sound. The group members also had ambitions of leaving their earlier sound due to insecurity in their songwriting along with the fact that their debut single "Sleep Little Girl" was ravaged in the Swedish press which left the band members extremely embarrassed.

1966 came to be a varying year in Tages chronology, as they their single releases from this year both marked a return to folk music while also retaining their hard-edged sound established by "The One For You". Their first single release of 1966, "So Many Girls", composed by bassist Göran Lagerberg, was the first in which the band intentionally steered towards a sound inspired by swedish folk music as it was largely acoustic and featured a flute theme which gave them a spot miming to the track on the Sveriges Television show  Kulturfönstret, which was largely aimed at highlights in the Swedish culture. In August of that year, the band's second studio album, Tages 2, was released. It featured a combination between songs with influences in folk along with rhythm and blues and also featured their single "In My Dreams", which was released a month earlier. According to Wrigholm, it was a "ballad which featured heavy overtones of wind instruments", which marked a milestone in Tages career, as it was considered one of the earliest examples where folk music were integrated into a song by a commercially successful pop band.

General 
On 28 April 1967, Tages released their fourth studio album Contrast and celebrated with a release party. The band had spent the entirety of the first three months of 1967 recording the album. The album received almost unanimously positive reviews from the Swedish press at the time, who directed their praise towards the musical direction the band had taken, into psychedelic pop which followed in the footsteps of their third album Extra Extra (1966). Particularly the single release of "Every Raindrop Means Alot" was given acclaim, being considered one of the best pop singles of that year. The material on the album was not entirely psychedelic, and with the exception of the baroque-themed song "Why Do You Hide It?", were there any traces of any folk music. Lennart Wrigholm writes that the album is generally "typical" for its time, owing the sound to the "psychedelic wave" which swept over the music scene in Sweden at the time. 

A major reason to their more relaxed sound during this time could be owed to the fact that Tages' contract with the Gothenburg-based label Platina Records had expired on New Year's Eve 1966, which allowed the band to move on to Parlophone, which they wanted to achieve for a multitude of reasons. Additionally, this sound was also supported by their overall willingness to experiment in the studio, largely made possible by their producer Anders Henriksson, who had worked with the band since their fourth single "The One for You" (1965) Henriksson had a history in producing a wide array of bands, including the Shanes whom saw hits due to his production work. Lagerberg states that in the duo's songwriting, Lagerberg wrote most of the lyrical content while Henriksson composed the music. A talented songwriter, he also wrote several tracks for the band, including "You're Too Incomprehensible" which had appeared on Contrast, a song which according to Kjell Wiremark was considered one of the first "true psychedelic works" in Sweden. Wiremark attributes the band's sound to drummer Lasse Svensson, who had just joined the band during the early recording sessions for Contrast.

Recording and production 

Work on Studio was generally sporadic across 1967, with most of it being completed in the autumn. Recording of the album began before the release of Contrast in April 1967. During a nightly session between 17 and 18 April of that year, Tages recorded "She's Having a Baby Now", a song composed by the entire band, at Europafilm Studios in Kallhäll, Bromma, Stockholm. Europafilm had additionally been Tages and Anders Henriksson's preferred studio. "She's Having a Baby Now" was intended for single release, as ordered by Parlophone records. The technician present during the recording of the song was Björn Almstedt who was a veteran engineer and a personal favorite of Henriksson. The result was satisfactory enough that Almstedt was chosen as the record's engineer during all of the sessions recording performed in Stockholm.

Almost immediately following the recording of "She's Having a Baby Now", Tages embarked on a tour of Sweden which was standard for Swedish bands at the time. Tages did not enter a studio during the entire summer, which was the most hectic part of the tour. The following recording session they conducted occurred in August, and produced yet another song aimed for single release, "Treat Her Like a Lady", a cover of the Lesley Gore song. According to Tages biographers Göran Brandels and Lennart Wrigholm, the recording studio became a "second home for the band", specifically when they recorded singles, as their career was "in a vacuum" in between hit singles. It would not be until the summer tour was over in August that Tages had a chance to incorporate and write new material into their repertoire.

It would not be until October that recording of Studio became serious, as requested by Parlophone. The first session aimed specifically at album release was held on 1 October at Europafilm, which was booked almost exclusively for Tages during a week's time, which was done to relieve band members from stress; no performances or tours were conducted during this week and the band members could come and go from the studio as they wished. At the same time,Sveriges Television became interested in sending a Christmas special aimed at young teens about pop music along with musical production in the studio. They were inspired by the Beatles participation in the international broadcast Our World from that summer and arranged for family, friends and two other bands, Hounds and Science Poption, to be present at the studio. Recorded at Europafilm on 4 October 1967, the programme Julgransplundring med Tages, featured the band singing the track "Have You Seen Your Brother Lately".

Their studio time at Europafilm lapsed on 8 October, with only a press conference on the 7th interrupting the recording sessions, in which Tages stated that Parlophone had arranged work permits for the United Kingdom, after which they flew to London on 9 October. Ahead of them was a three week long tour during which they would attempt to have a breakthrough on the English market, which was largely headed by appearances on numerous television shows and performances. By the end of the tour, the band and Henriksson were given the opportunity to record at the EMI Studios (later Abbey Road Studios) in London, which was made possible by being on Parlophone's roster, the label who owned the studio. The studio was booked for three days, on the 23 through the 25th of October, at which they recorded two tracks, "Like a Woman" and "It's in a Dream". According to Lagerberg, the band were "stressed" by being present at the studio, feeling inferior to their British peers.

Tages returned to Sweden by the end of October and once again studio time at Europafilm was booked on 11, 12 14, and 16 November to finish the remainder of Studio's tracks. The recording sessions featured an unprecedented amount of session musicians in Swedish pop music at the time, primarily focused on songs which required string quartets or brass sections, which the Swedish Radio Symphony Orchestra and Lars Samuelson's Orchestra were hired to provide. In addition to producing the sessions, Henriksson, who was a multi-instrumentalist, provided most keyboard instruments to the album, which included piano, organ and the celesta.

Songs and composition

Overview 
Lagerberg and Henriksson wrote and rehearsed the majority of their contributions to Studio in the late summer of 1967. Lagerberg and Henriksson had struck up a songwriting partnership and had become close friends, starting with the song "Hear My Lamentation" released on Contrast. Henriksson's home in Tureberg, in Sollentuna was initially used as a base for the duo's songwriting where Lagerberg would "crash on a horrible couch" which would keep him up at night, allowing him to focus on songwriting. As time progressed, Henriksson, who grew up in the Swedish county of Dalarna during his first few years, took great inspiration from staying there which would eventually lead to him and Lagerberg spending an increasing amount of time in his parents summer cottage, located in the small village of Tällberg by the lake Siljan, all of which came to influence several songs found on the album.

According to vocalist Blom, these tracks uses instruments present in "ancient Swedish history", instruments generally used in genres not connected to pop music. Kieron Tyler states that Studio was a unique album in the sense that while the rest of the music industry were "following the Beatles venture into Indian music and sitars, Tages instead turned to their own cultural heritage which gave the album its distinctive sound." Henriksson saw it as a tribute to the spelemän present in Dalarna and thus wanted to incorporate it into their own music. On the contrary, Lasse Svensson instead states that the usage of Swedish folk music was a "gimmick which was the present [1967] trend", and refrained from using influences from India because of the Beatles doing it.

The presence of folk instruments is limited to about half of Studios tracks, which Tyler states garnered the album the distinction of being an "archetype in psychedelic folk" and "an essential piece" of vispop. The other material on the album, mostly the tracks not composed by Lagerberg and Henriksson, seek influences elsewhere which with the inclusion of brass- and string instruments have seen critics deeming some of the material baroque pop. As with their previous two albums, Extra Extra and Contrast, Studio further showcases Tages experimenting with psychedelic sounds in the studio, including previous studio gimmicks previously used by the band, such as backmasked electric guitar, a presence of the Leslie speaker, primarily used by lead guitarist Anders Töpel, along with reverberation and feedback that prevail on some of the albums tracks. Due to the variety of genres found on it, Wrigholm believes the album is not "plagiated from Beatles nor any other English bands", although states that it is a product of its time.The absence of any lyrical theme was not uncommon in the Swedish music scene at the time, as most Swedish teenagers buying their records did not have any deeper grasp in the English language which meant that the band saw lyrics as an afterthought to the music.

 Side one 

Studio opens with the song "Have You Seen Your Brother Lately", which Tyler sees as "the archetype of the group's rock and folk fusion". The title of the song most likely came as an accident after Lagerberg misread the title of the Rolling Stones song "Have You Seen Your Mother, Baby, Standing in the Shadow?" (1966), which Henriksson found amusing enough to write a melody to it. The song, which opens with a fade "into an orchasmic array of folk instruments before Tages themselves come in on their instruments", was meant to set the tone for the rest of the album. "It's My Life", which follows, bases its sound on a hard rock riff which complements the somewhat introspective lyrics by Lagerberg. The track has prominent vocal harmonies and a chorus where the backing vocalists sing in a counter-melody to Lagerberg's lead vocals. On the track Henriksson plays an accordion in the style of French Bal-musette which deviates from the established sound provided on the song.

"Like a Woman" was composed by Lagerberg, Henriksson along with rhythm guitarist Danne Larsson. The song is the first of two recorded at EMI in London and was allegedly written during the night before the recording session as Tages did not have any other songs ready. Wiremark states that "Like a Woman" lyrically features Lagerberg singing about how a "sixteen year old moves and loves like a woman". The midpoint of side one provides a change as the focus switches from songs dominated  and sung by Lagerberg to songs written and sung by Blom. The first of which, "People Without Faces", see Tages mixed low as the melody largely is supplemented through a string quartet by the Swedish Radio Symphony Orchestra. The song was personal to Blom, who was fed up with his grandparents, as the lyrics are directed towards older generations who got nothing better to do than complain on a television show.

"I Left My Shoes at Home", was written by Blom and Larsson. The song is about Blom as he sits in a park without shoes, which he forgot under the table in his living room. It features a somewhat moody and abrasive piano opening line performed by Larsson. The band is then accompanied on brass by Lasse Samuelson's Orchestra during the choruses after which a "battle between strings and guitars" as Wiremark describes it occurs during the brief instrumental break in the song. Side one's closer, "She Is A Man" is the first song on Studio without the involvement of any band members, as it was written by Henriksson and 19-year old producer Bengt Palmers. Wiremark calls it the album's most "conventionally psychedelic song" due to the heavy usage of backmasked guitar by Töpel. The song features two lead vocalists; Blom sings during the verses while producer Henriksson provides the falsetto lead during the chorus. "She Is a Man" is lyrically either about a transvestite or a trans woman, something which is never properly defined.

 Side two 

Side two opens with the song "Seeing With Love". It was largely written by Lagerberg but credited to the entire band because he thought the creative process in the studio made it a group composition. The song features some of Studio's more complex arrangements regarding both the brass performances and vocal harmonies, the latter of which have echo applied to them through mechanical processes. The song heavily feature session musician Janne Kling, who contributes the cornett, crumhorn and the Swedish folk instrument spilåpipa through multitracking. The song's ending features a performance on the fiddle mirroring the melody line, which Brandels and Wrigholm note as "wonderful and creative". The following track, "Created By You", is the first and only composition not related to the band, having been written by Claes Dieden, guitarist of Science Poption who gave the band the song on 4 October 1967 during the recording of the programme Julgransplundring med Tages. The ballad features sporadic appearances of the flute along with Henriksson on celesta.

The following song, "What's The Time" was written by Blom and Larsson yet strangely sung by Lagerberg. The song is the one which deviates the most from the material on Studio, as it is an upbeat soul-pop song which heavily features Lasse Samuelson's Orchestra playing brass instruments throughout. The flute which persists during the instrumental break keeps it connected with the general folk sound found on the other songs. Lyrically, the song is relatively conventional as it regards love through a longing narrator. "It's In a Dream", was written by Lagerberg and Henriksson. The song is largely characterized by the reiterating piano riff performed by Henriksson, which repeats after the verses and choruses, along with lead guitar ran through a Leslie speaker by Töpel. Lyrically, the song tackles peace through metaphors involving Robin Hood, while alluding to child soldiers and war on multiple occassions.

"She's Having a Baby Now" lyrically revolves around teenage pregnancy out-of-wedlock. Lead vocalist Blom describes the lyrics as social pornographic and as criticism of family separations by stating that it was a "family disaster". Musically, the song was a group composition, largely fuelled by the vocal harmonies along with the interchanging vocals by Lagerberg and Blom. The album closes with "The Old Man Wafwer", which is an instrumental, the only one Tages ever recorded during their career. The composition is split into two specific section, one which heavily revolves around an arrangement of brass instruments by Lasse Samuelson's Orchestra which follows into a "riff" on the accordion played by Henriksson. The second part is a bit more "free-form" which is heavily supplemented by Kling's flute playing throughout, while Svensson's drums also have a major part in the general arrangement. The title was taken from a man who lived on Vaverön, an island on Siljan where Lagerberg and Henriksson took inspiration from.

 Artwork and title 

Both the front and back covers of Studio were taken during the same photo session. It is generally accepted that photographer Walter Hirsch took them, but the location they were shot at is disputed; according to Brandels and Wrigholm, the cover was taken at Pop-In, a club in Gothenburg, while Wiremark states that it was taken at another club in Göteborg, namely Jazzen. Hirsch was hired by Parlophone to take the photos, depicting Tages' members jamming or rehearsing because they wanted to ensure a set of photos that could be used in promotional material. The photos were allegedly shot during drummer Lasse Svensson's first rehearsal with the band on 22 January 1967, despite the fact that this has never been confirmed by neither Hirsch nor the band. The cover was a relative departure from the artistic aesthetics present on the group's three previous albums, Tages 2 (1966), Extra Extra and Contrast, instead being a straightforward picture of the band.

Studio was the first album by Tages to be released in a gatefold cover. The inlay of the gatefold was relatively simple, depicting the band members during the recording process of the album. Their faces were then superimposed over the words Studio which added to the artistic appeal of the album. The typeface used for the album title, both on the front and back covers, was Futura Black, which was a reference and homage to the Who's album My Generation (1965), which also used it on the cover. One of the photos in the inlay also depict Henriksson, which was added as he was considered to be an unofficial member of the band due to his involvement in their records and compositions. It also features a picture of a speleman, Hubert Westerman, who's photo was added as a nod and homage to the album's sound which was rooted in music from Dalarna. The liner notes were written by either guitarist Töpel or journalist Hans Sidén, both of whom had contributed to them previously. The title Studio was a suggestion by lead vocalist Blom, which the group accepted as it was an internationally viable name. The name was chosen as a nod to Henriksson for his work in producing the album, and to the amounts of effort and editing the recording sessions took.

 Release and commercial performance 
The release of Studio was preluded by two singles and an announcement from their fan club. In June 1967, Parlophone released "She's Having a Baby Now" as their third single on that label, backed by "Sister's Got a Boyfriend" from Contrast. It was Tages biggest commercial failure since their 1966 release "Crazy 'Bout My Baby", as it failed to chart on both Tio i Topp and Kvällstoppen. Distressed by this perceived lack of success, Tages released the follow-up "Treat Her Like a Lady" with "Wanting" from Contrast on the B-side, on 26 September, only two months after their previous single. It fared better, reaching number three and seven on Tio i Topp and Kvällstoppen respectively. According to Lagerberg, the release and recording of Studio were entirely dependent on whether or not these singles would become hits or not, which meant that "Treat Her Like a Lady" becoming a hit "was a relief for both Parlophone and us [Tages]".

Only a few days following the release of "Treat Her Like a Lady", Tages fan club issued a statement that Tages had "begun recording their album" which would be out by Christmas. Cashing in on "Treat Her Like a Lady" and the Christmas rush that was to come Parlophone issued Studio on 4 December 1967 in a limited pressing of 5000 copies. Despite being considered as an album to release as Tages international breakthrough, Studio was upon original release only issued in Sweden and Denmark. After having two singles, "I'm Going Out" and "Treat Her Like a Lady" chart in the Danish top ten, Parlophone believed that the band were big enough to warrant a release of their album in Denmark. There, it was issued in January 1968. The Danish and Swedish issues share the same covers which were printed in Sweden, but feature different discs pressed in both countries. Swedish-printed copies of the album were also distributed in Norway and Finland, as the band were relatively big in both of these territories.

Studio did not sell as well as Parlophone and Tages wanted, the latter whom were shocked when the album failed to become a big seller in Sweden. Unlike their two first albums, which sold well to become certified gold albums, Studio barely sold the 5000 initial copies that were printed. According to Wrigholm, the commercial failure of the album was based on a few factors; it was relatively uncommercial compared to their previous records which alienated their teenage fans. Additionally, Tages were considered too "poppy" and for musical snobs who otherwise might have enjoyed the album, but refrained from doing so. Blom became disappointed in the failure of the album, so much so that he too began feeling alienated with the music industry, stating that "Nobody knew how to manage a group, nobody knew anything about it", criticizing Parlophone for their failure to promote the album and the band's failure to crack the English music market.

In a last-ditch effort to promote Studio, Parlophone and Tages arranged for a movie shoot which then would air on Sveriges Television. The movie, which was due to be a half-hour special, featured the band dressed up, miming to several tracks from the album, along with the subsequent single "Fantasy Island". It was decided that Peter Goldmann was going to produce the film. Sveriges Television were enthusiastic over the project, and financed it completely since most people involved did not have enough money to do so, including Tages. The short film was shot in April 1968 and was shot on location in both Dalarna and at Radiohuset in Stockholm, where a special stage was set up for the band to perform. Amongst the songs from the album the band mimed to in the film were "Have You Seen Your Brother Lately", "Like a Woman" and  "Seeing With Love". The short film was named Dalamania as a double entendre; both as a nod to Beatlemania and Dalarna, both whom Tages had great respect for. Dalamania was aired on Sveriges Television's only national channel on 31 May 1968 which despite positive reviews did not increase sales for Studio.

 Critical reception 

 Contemporary reviews 
Upon original release, albums were not considered as important as singles, and not many publications reviewed Studio. Reviews of the album was generally limited to teen magazines, including Bildjournalen, where their in-house reviewer, Håkan Sandén, who was a Tages fan gave the album a review. He writes that it is fun to write about "Swedish top-pop" which "is heard through" Studio. Although he is stated as having been initially disappointed by the album, as it did not live up to his expectations given by press releases, he still found the album "phenomonal". He comments that despite Tages ability to "borrow" aspects from their idols, that Studio in no way plagiarizes these releases. He believes to hear influences of the Beatles on the record, but says that the inclusion of "Swedish folk tones" as great and something which "differentiates" the records from contemporary pop music recorded in Sweden. Sandén also singles out the inclusion of "She's Having a Baby Now" for praise, as he believes it to be his favorite recording by the group. He does state that the rest of the album is "almost as excellent throughout." He ends the review by praising the album cover.

Elsewhere, Studio was reviewed by the staff writers for Expressen, who state that Studio was not as "odd and strange" compared to Contrast. The reviewer praises the songs on the album, writing that several of the easily "gets stuck in your head". The writer states that the album is "impressing", and praises some of the lyrics found on the album, believing that Tages "have found the importance of lyrics as well as music." although they write that much of the material on Studio is great, Tages somewhat suffers from "pretentiousness" which ruins the immersion sometimes, and criticizes Tages for their inclusion of folk instruments, stating that "they were lost in the forest of gimmicks". Svenska Dagbladet gives the album a brief, positive review, stating that it is a "well-produced"  and performed albums by musicians who "very well know what they're doing." Additionally, they commented on the gatefold cover, considering it "unique".

According to Aftonbladet, Studio sees "Tages botanizing in folk music", praising most of the material found on the album. Despite praising the production and recording of the album, they are somewhat disappointed in the inclusion of folk instruments, which are not as "advanced as classical albums would have it". They also describe some of the lyrics as "stiff or awkward", particularly in "People Without Faces". Despite their criticism, they call the album "worthvile" and considers it one of "the best Swedish LPs" as of lately. In Göteborgs Handels- och Sjöfartstidning, Henning Svensson states that the album is "Tages most personal LP" which wins "by lengths" compared to albums by contemporary pop-groups Ola & the Janglers and the Hounds. Svensson comments that Tages "were trying to find new ways" with the album, something they succeed with. He praises the inclusion of folk musicians which "makes the album unique, possibly the first of its kind" and applauds the general songwriting and production effort. In Hudiksvalls Tidning, the reviewer writes that Studio showcases Tages "ever growing musical ambitions" and compliments the songwriting of the songs, which they state are "on another level" to other albums reviewed that day.

 Retrospective assessment 
Retrospectively, Studio has also received acclaim by reviewers. In a review for AllMusic, music critic Richie Unterberger states that Studio sounds "pretty close to a mid-60's British group", which he attributes to Tages' ability and will to adapt to the current musical climate. Therefore, Unterberger states that it is not unsurprising that Studio would contain "florid-pop psychedelia" with "productional gimmicks", whimsical songwriting along with "soul and orchestration in the arrangements". Although he believes that Studio is "carefully arranged and produced", the songs found on the album "do not live up to their British influences". While he believes there are no bad tracks on the album, he does not single out specific songs for praise, writing that the album largely is composed "of approaches that were in fashion". He ends the review by praising Henrikssons work, stating that the album features "unique production tricks" which increase the appeal of the album.

Writing for Mojo magazine, Kieron Tyler describes Studio as a "groundbreaking riposte" to the Beatles Sgt. Pepper's Lonely Hearts Club Band, while further stating that the album "was Sweden's best pop album of the 1960s." He states that Tages were "progressing forward" with the album and that it is "as striking" as Odessey and Oracle (1968) by The Zombies, while simultaneously describing it to be "much more hard-hitting" than Butterfly (1967) by the Hollies. He positively reviews Tages decision to use folk instruments rather than looking elsewhere for inspiration, stating that this "was radical" for its time. Tyler believes that the album was groundbreaking as it "fused tradiitonal Swedish instruments" with "psych-pop", while ending the review by stating that it is as "important as any album by the Beatles". According to journalist Andres Lokko, the thing that distinguished Studio from contemporary albums, both Swedish and internationally, was "the confidence and usage in the Nordic folk music that characterizes so much of the content". 

In The Times, Studio is described as "a record in a palpable thrall" compared to the "nascent psych-pop" from the United Kingdom. They single out both "Have You Seen Your Brother Lately" and "She's Having a Baby Now" for praise, considering them "punchier" equaivalents to David Bowie's debut album from the same year. They end the review by stating that the album is a "magnificent period piece". In a staff review for BrooklynVegan, the album could not have been more "aptly named" They state that the album "reveals itself" with repeated listens and believes that the album is a "finely crafted piece of work" despite the fact that they never made it big outside of Sweden. They end by describing the album as a "treat". In Rock & Roll magazine, Martin Theander compares Studio with work from the beatles, stating that both had inspiration from the same sources which led to him calling it "a Swedish Sgt. Pepper". Despite this, Theander believes that Studio has a place reserved right next to Odessey and Oracle rather than any Beatles album, while simultaneously believing Tages should get the same cult status as the Zombies got. He ends the review by stating that it should be listened to by "every pop musician" and considered their "holy heirloom".

 Legacy 

Studio was the first release in a row of singles and albums by Tages which were met with "disastrous commercial, though superb critical" reception. Following "Treat Her Like a Lady", most singles by the band were ignored by the press; the following single, "There's a Blind Man Playin' Fiddle in the Street" (1968) was their final charting release, reaching number 10 on Tio i Topp for a week in February 1968. Wrigholm claims these failures were for the same reason Studio failed to sell; they were artistical highpoints which did not appeal to record buyers. At the same time, lead vocalist Blom had largely become disillusioned with the band as he was largely considered a secondary member by 1968, largely overshadowed by Lagerberg who by this point had become Tages artistical driving force. This, combined with the perceived lack of commercial success, culminated with him leaving the band during the summer of 1968 in order to focus on a solo career, leaving the rest of the band as a quartet. Following Blom's departure, Tages would do one final attempt at international success, after they recorded the similarly folk-inspired album The Lilac Years in London in 1969; for this release the band was renamed to Blond which made Studio the last album recorded under Tages name.

After the release, Studio fell into obscurity as the musical directions in Sweden changed into heavier rock and the political movement progg. It would not be until the 1980s that the album received widespread acclaim and was seen as a major influence on folk-rock fusion, which was prevalent during the 1970s in Sweden, particularly with progg music.  For the widespread usage of Swedish folk musicians, Tages were seen as pioneers by many critics, whom pointed out that such fusion had not occurred on the Swedish music scene by then. By then, the album was spreading through word of mouth and became a cult album amongst fans of 1960s pop music in Sweden. Blom argues that the band should've recorded it a year later, as it was "a bit before 1969 and 1970 when groups in Sweden got money from the Government" through the Ministry of Culture. In 1997, Swedish Musicians' Union magazine Topp 40 put Studio at a position of number 36 on their list of the best Swedish albums of all time. Similarly, popular magazine Sonic placed it 35th on their list of the 100 best original Swedish albums, where it was the only one by a Swedish pop band of the 1960s.

Despite this, Studio would remain unissued in full until 1994, when it was released on their Fantasy Island compilation, which compiled all their later work. Fantasy Island was in turn issued as part of the 3-CD box-set This One's For You!, which collected all of Tages' recorded output. The first dedicated re-release of the album came in 1998 when it was re-mastered and released on CD through EMI Records, a release which featured bonus tracks, all of which were the A-side and B-sides of their 1968 singles, including "Fantasy Island". This was followed by the album's first international release in 2010 on RPM Records, compiled by Kieron Tyler who wanted the "rest of the world to experience Tages music". That CD contained the same bonus tracks as the 1998 one did. In 2015, it received its first vinyl re-issue for Record Store Day, and was released under the Parlophone brand, and was an exact replica of the 1967 LP. In 2017, Bear Family Records would also issue the album on vinyl, which featured a different layout compared to the original release.

Track listing
Writing credits adapted from original 1967 release. Track lengths and vocals according the liner notes of the 1998 re-issue of Studio.

Personnel
Personnel according to the liner notes of the 1998 re-issue of Studio.TagesTommy Blomlead vocals (4–6, 8, 11), rhythm guitar, percussion
Göran Lagerberglead vocals (1–3, 7, 9–11), harmony and backing vocals (2–3, 5, 7), bass guitar
Danne Larssonrhythm guitar, piano (5), harmony and backing vocals (3, 5, 7–8, 11)
Anders Töpellead guitar, harmony and backing vocals (11)
Lasse Svenssondrums, percussionProductionAnders Henrikssonproducer, technician, lead vocals (6), harmony and backing vocals (2–3, 5, 7–8, 11), piano (6, 8–11), organ (1–3, 9–10), celesta (4, 8), accordion (2, 12)
Ron Richardsco-producer (3, 10)TechniciansBjörn AlmstedtTechnician (1–2, 4–9, 11–12)
Ken Scotttechnician (3, 10)
Jeff Jarrattechnician (3, 10)Other musiciansSwedish Radio Symphony Orchestraclassical string instruments (4–5, 12)
Lasse Samuelson's Orchestrabrass instruments (5, 7, 9, 12)
Skansen's Spelmanslagviolins, fiddles (1)  
violin, fiddle (1, 7) 
violin, fiddle (1, 7) 
Janne Klingcornett (1, 7), crumhorn (7), spilåpipa (7), flute (8–9, 12)

 Notes and references NotesReferences'

References

Sources 

 
 
 
 
 

 
 
 
 

1967 albums
Tages (band) albums
Albums produced by Ron Richards (producer)
Parlophone albums
Psychedelic folk albums
Folk rock albums by Swedish artists
Psychedelic rock albums by Swedish artists
Baroque pop albums